Bolshaya Kondratovskaya is a rural locality (a village) in Kargopolsky District, Arkhangelsk Oblast, Russia. The population was 18 as of 2012.

Geography 
Bolshaya Kondratovskaya is located 21 km south of Kargopol (the district's administrative centre) by road. Sidorovskaya is the nearest rural locality.

References 

Rural localities in Kargopolsky District